Dennis Aloysius Mahony (January 20, 1821 in Rosscarbery, County Cork, Ireland – November 6, 1879) was one of the founders of the Dubuque Herald (now the Telegraph Herald), a newspaper in Dubuque, Iowa, during the American Civil War.

Biography
Mahony was born in Rosscarbery, County Cork, Ireland. At the age of 9, he emigrated with his family to Philadelphia, Pennsylvania in 1831. He studied theology and law before moving to Iowa in 1843, but initially held several other jobs (teaching, postmaster, justice of the peace) before being admitted to the bar in 1847.

He was elected to the Iowa House of Representatives from Jackson County in 1848 and in 1858. In 1849 he became editor of The Miner's Express; and in 1852 he co-founded the Dubuque Herald, the first daily paper in Iowa. Mahony was also active in regional politics.

He was a highly partisan Northern Democrat of Copperhead sympathies and wrote articles that negatively criticized Abraham Lincoln and the conduct of the Civil 
War. He was arrested on August 14, 1862 by U.S. Marshal H.M. Hoxie for publishing an editorial article that was allegedly disloyal to the government. He was transported from Dubuque to Washington D.C, and held at the Old Capitol Prison. He was released from prison on November 10, but only after signing a document stating that he would "form an allegiance to the United States, and would not bring any charges against those who had arrested and confined him."

During his captivity, he was the Democratic nominee for Congress; he was defeated by William B. Allison. He would later serve two terms as sheriff of Dubuque County.

Mahony wrote a book about his experience entitled Prisoner of State which was published in 1863. He, Stilson Hutchins, and John Hodnett established the St. Louis Star newspaper in 1866, but Mahony sold his share and returned to Dubuque, where he edited the Dubuque Telegraph until his death.

He is buried at St. Patrick's Cemetery in Garryowen, Iowa in the northwest corner of Jackson County, a few miles south of Bernard, Iowa.

See also
Clement Vallandigham

References

Constance R. Cherba and Edward E. Deckert, "Mahoney: Political Dissident, Prisoner of State", Civil War Times, June 2007, pp. 59–63

External links
 Dennis Mahony information at CelticCousins.net
 Web article on Prisoner of State
Downloadable copy of Prisoner of State
Political graveyard

1821 births
1879 deaths
People of Iowa in the American Civil War
Irish emigrants to the United States (before 1923)
19th-century American newspaper publishers (people)
Editors of Iowa newspapers
Writers from Dubuque, Iowa
Politicians from Philadelphia
Democratic Party members of the Iowa House of Representatives
19th-century American newspaper founders
Iowa sheriffs
19th-century American journalists
American male journalists
19th-century American male writers
Journalists from Pennsylvania
People from Rosscarbery
Catholics from Pennsylvania
Catholics from Iowa
19th-century American politicians